Okonoko is an unincorporated community in Hampshire County in the U.S. state of West Virginia. Okonoko is located north of Levels on the Potomac River at Bright's Hollow. The community's placename is the only one of its kind within the United States.

Originally known as Cacaponville on the Baltimore & Ohio Railroad because of its proximity to the mouth of the Little Cacapon River, the community's name was changed to Okonoko in the 1850s. In 1890, Okonoko had a permanent population of 46 and had both a post office and an express office in use on the railroad. When the Baltimore & Ohio Railroad lost favor as a mode of transportation of people and goods, Okonoko's residents relocated elsewhere for employment. The town's post office closed in 1958 and its mail was routed through nearby Paw Paw. Today, Okonoko consists of several residences that date from the start of the 20th century which are now used as second vacation homes. Okonoko has become a popular recreational area for hunting, fishing, and boating on the Potomac River.

Okonoko can be reached from Levels by Levels-Okonoko Road (County Route 5/6) or Bright's Hollow Road (County Route 5/5) and from Little Cacapon by Okonoko-Little Cacapon Road (County Route 2/7).

References

External links

Unincorporated communities in Hampshire County, West Virginia
Unincorporated communities in West Virginia
Baltimore and Ohio Railroad
West Virginia populated places on the Potomac River